Warehouse Rumble is a Hardy Boys mystery novel in the Digest series, credited to the pseudonymous Franklin W. Dixon and published in 2004.

Plot
Frank and Joe Hardy, two teens with a knack for solving mysteries, try to find out what (or who) is causing the problems with the set of Warehouse Rumble, a reality based game that has come to Bayport. When the Hardy Boys sign on, and a skeleton is discovered on-set, Frank and Joe must find the source of the trouble while continuing to compete in the game.

References

The Hardy Boys books
2004 American novels
2004 children's books